Sasha Palomäki (born 4 September 1991) is a Finnish former competitive ice dancer.  

Palomäki teamed up with Russian ice dancer Oksana Klimova in the summer of 2007. They are the 2009 and 2010 Finnish national champions. They split after the 2009-10 season.

Competitive highlights
With Klimova

 J = Junior level

With Westerlund

References

External links

Navigation

1991 births
Finnish male ice dancers
Living people
Sportspeople from Espoo